Gianni Zanasi (born August 6, 1965) is an Italian film director. He has been a writer and has been an actor also in a few films.

Biography 

Zanasi was born in Vignola.  After studying philosophy at the University of Bologna, he enrolled in a school of theatrical writing and a course in film directed by Nanni Moretti. He attended the Experimental Center of Cinematography in Rome, where in 1992 he graduated from directing. His directorial debut is with the melee (1995), the first feature selected for Director's Fortnight of the Cannes Film Festival.

He made his debut with the short film The beautiful evidence, which won a prize at the Turin Film Festival. Two years later the same cast was reassembled for his first feature film, In the melee, which focused on five Roman boys.  It was shown at the Cannes Film Festival and won awards at various festivals around the world.

Zanasi also directed the television miniseries Fathers and Sons and the documentary Life is short but the day is long, but returned in 2007 to feature films with the comedy Do not think, starring Valerio Mastandrea, Anita Caprioli, Giuseppe Battiston, Caterina Murino, Paul Briguglia, Dino Abbrescia, Teco Celio, Gisella Burinato, Luciano Scarpa, and Paul Sassanelli. Critically acclaimed, the film gave rise in 2009 to a television series of the same name, broadcast by Fox Italy, directed by Zanasi and Pellegrini, with the same cast as the original title.

Filmography 

Writer - Non pensarci, la serie ( TV Series )

 Cinque pezzi facili (2009)
 La grande abbuffata (2009)
 Il candidato (2009)
 Il padrino (2009)
 Pretty Woman (2009)

References

External links 
 

1965 births
Living people
Italian film directors
University of Bologna alumni